Paul Henry may refer to:

Paul Henry (astronomer) (1848–1905), French optician and astronomer
Paul Henry (painter) (1876–1958), Irish artist
Paul B. Henry (1942–1993), U.S. Congressman and political scientist
Paul Henry (actor) (born 1947), British actor best known for his role in Crossroads
Paul Henry (Belgian footballer) (1912–1989), Belgian footballer
Paul Henry (English footballer) (born 1988), English footballer
Paul Henry (cricketer) (born 1970), New Zealand cricketer
Paul Henry (poet) (born 1959), Welsh poet
Paul Henry (broadcaster) (born 1960), New Zealand broadcaster
The Paul Henry Show, a former late news New Zealand television programme presented by Paul Henry
Paul Henry (TV programme), a former breakfast New Zealand television programme presented by Paul Henry

See also
Henry (surname)
Henry Paul (disambiguation)